Port Vila Football League, also known as the Digicel League or more simply, the Digicel Premier League is the main football competition in Port Vila, Vanuatu. It consists of 3 competitions: Port Vila Premier League, Port Vila First Division and the Port Vila Second Division. The league's domestic cup is the Port Vila FA Cup, in which all 3 divisions compete in.

The Port Vila Premier League is considered to be the best football league in Vanuatu while the Port Vila Football Association is considered to be the main football association in Vanuatu.
The top 4 of the Port Vila Premier League qualifies for the PVFA top four competition, and the winner of that competition is one of the two teams that takes part for Vanuatu in the OFC Champions League. The other team is the winner of the VFF National Super League which is a round-robin competition of the best teams of the islands of Vanuatu. The main island where Port Vila is, Efate is not included in this competition.

The league is not fully professional.

Members

All teams and leagues are for the 2019/20 season

List of champions

Port Vila Premier League
The list with Port Villa Champions:

Port Vila First Division

Port Vila Second Division

Performances

Domestic Cups

Port Vila Independence Cup
The Port Vila Independence Cup is held in July. The final match is played on July 30, Vanuatu's independence day

Port Vila Shield
The Port Vila Shield is the National Cup held in January each year since 2013.
Previous Winners of the Port Vila Shield are:

Port Vila FA Cup
The Port Vila FA Cup (PVFA Cup) was originally a tournament held as a warm-up for the 8 teams that play in the Digicel Premier League. As of 2016, the PVFA Cup became a tournament for all of the 27 teams of the first 3 divisions. 
Previous winners of the PVFA Cup are:

Top Four Super League
The Top Four Super League is a competition played between the top four teams of the Port Vila Football League to decide one of the two representatives of Vanuatu in the OFC Champions League (the other representative is from the VFF National Super League).

See also
VFF National Super League

References

 
1
Top level football leagues in Oceania
Sports leagues established in 1994